Eucalyptus xerothermica is a species of mallee or a tree that is endemic to northern Western Australia. It has rough, fibrous or flaky bark on the trunk and branches, lance-shaped to curved adult leaves, flower buds in groups of three or seven, creamy white flowers and conical to barrel-shaped fruit.

Description

Taxonomy and naming
Eucalyptus xerothermica was first formally described in 2000 by Lawrie Johnson and Ken Hill in the journal Telopea from specimens collected near the Fortescue River in 1983. The specific epithet (xerothermica is from ancient Greek words meaning "dry" and "hot", referring to the climate where this species grows.

Distribution and habitat
This eucalypt is found on floodplains and channel banks in the Pilbara, North West Cape and nearby islands where it grows in low, open savanna.

Conservation status
This species is classified as "not threatened" by the Western Australian Government Department of Parks and Wildlife.

See also
List of Eucalyptus species

References

Eucalypts of Western Australia
Trees of Australia
xerothermica
Myrtales of Australia
Plants described in 2000
Taxa named by Lawrence Alexander Sidney Johnson
Taxa named by Ken Hill (botanist)